The Primal Urge is a 1961 science fiction novel by Brian Aldiss. A satire on sexual reserve, it explores the effects on society of a forehead-mounted "Emotion Register" that glows when the wearer experiences sexual attraction. The book was banned in Ireland.

References

External links
The Primal Urge on Brian Aldiss's official site

1961 British novels
1961 science fiction novels
British science fiction novels
Novels by Brian Aldiss
Ballantine Books books